Lloydtown is a hamlet located in King Township, Ontario, Canada. It is often associated with the surrounding and larger Schomberg, though it has its own unique characteristics and heritage.

History
The Lloydtown Rebellion of 1837 was part of the Upper Canada Rebellion. During the 1830s, Lloydtown was well known as a site for reform sympathisers, and regular meetings were hosted by Jesse Lloyd. On November 24, 1837, a final meeting to review plans was held between Lloyd and William Lyon Mackenzie. Hoping to take advantage of the departure of troops to Lower Canada in response to the Lower Canada Rebellion, Mackenzie had planned to seize a government arms cache in York on December 7.

Climate
Lloydtown has a continental climate moderated by the Great Lakes and influenced by warm, moist air masses from the south, and cold, dry air from the north. The Oak Ridges Moraine affects levels of precipitation: as an air mass arrives from Lake Ontario and reaches the elevated ground surface of the moraine, it rises causing precipitation.

Notable people
Alfred M. Cook, American politician and farmer, was born in Lloydtown.

References

Notes

External links

Communities in King, Ontario